Mount Gilmour is a mountain 4 nautical miles (7 km) southeast of Mount Passel on the central part of the irregular ridge separating Crevasse Valley Glacier and Arthur Davis Glacier (ex-Warpasgiljo Glacier), in the Edsel Ford Ranges of Marie Byrd Land, Antarctica.

West Base Geological Party Expedition 

Discovered in 1940 by the four Geological Party Expedition members of the West Base, Little America III of the United States Antarctic Service (USAS).  Named for Harold P. Gilmour, one of the four Geological Party Expedition members, recorder, and subsequently historian and administrative assistant to the expedition commander, Rear Admiral Richard E. Byrd.

In February 1940, shortly after West Base was set up in Little America III,  Dr. Paul Siple directed an airplane flight from the West Base to the Edsel Ford Ranges to determine where exploration and geological work was to be done during the next summer season, and numerous aerial photographs were taken. During the long winter months that followed, fairly accurate maps were made of the Southern Edsel Ford Ranges. During the 1940 winter night, a Geological Party Expedition of four explorers was organized and they prepared for the extremely long trek on two dog sleds to the Edsel Ford Ranges. The four-man party was composed of Lawrence A. Warner, leader and geologist, Charles F. Passel, geologist and radio operator, Harold P. Gilmour "Gil", recorder and collector of biological specimens and Loran  Wells "Joe", photographer and observer. The extensive Warpasgiljo Glacier was discovered and named for these four members (WARner + PASsel + GILmour + JOe) of the Geological Party Expedition.

The Geological Party's Expedition objective was to map and geologically survey as much of the southern portion of the Edsel Ford Range as possible, and additionally investigate the natural resources of the area and triangulate accurately for improved maps of the region. In the nearly three-month expedition, they had to be supported by airplanes that deposited supplies at  intervals along their charted route. The Geological Party Expedition visited for the first time some 50 peaks in this region and some 300 geological specimens were collected. Mount Gilmour was one of those peaks.

Expedition Dog Sleds used in the 1939-1941 Byrd Polar Expedition 

During the 1939-1941 Expedition, dog sleds were the most reliable form of ground exploration in Antarctica. A dog sled team capable of transporting two men contained nine dogs. The other  were used for fuel and camping equipment.

See also
Wells Ridge

References

Gilmour, Mount